Jafar Alam is a Bangladeshi politician and the incumbent Member of Bangladesh Parliament from Cox's Bazar-1.

Career
Alam was elected to Parliament from Cox's Bazar-1 as a Bangladesh Awami League candidate on 30 December 2018. He was elected after Hasina Ahmed on that seat at 9th parliament. So Alam is serving for the second term.

References

Living people
11th Jatiya Sangsad members
Awami League politicians
1957 births